These are the official results of the Men's Shot Put event at the 2003 World Championships in Paris, France. There were a total number of 31 participating athletes, with the final held on Saturday 23 August 2003.

Medalists

Schedule
All times are Central European Time (UTC+1)

Abbreviations
All results shown are in metres

Qualification
 Held on Saturday 23 August 2003

Final

See also
 2003 Shot Put Year Ranking

References
 Results (Archived 2009-05-14)
 Results (Shot-put)

J
Shot put at the World Athletics Championships